Cryptocarya triplinervis is a rainforest tree growing in eastern Australia. Common names include the three veined laurel, three veined cryptocarya and the brown laurel.

Cryptocarya triplinervis var. triplinervis grows in littoral rainforests on sandy soils. Another variety var. pubens grows at higher altitude by streams, on volcanic or alluvial soil.

The natural range of distribution is from Smoky Cape (30° S), near South West Rocks, New South Wales to the Daintree River (16° S) in tropical Queensland. It also occurs on Lord Howe Island where it is known as blackbutt.

Description 
Cryptocarya triplinervis is a small tree, occasionally reaching 20 metres in height and with a trunk diameter of 60 cm. The bark is grey brown, mostly smooth with lines of vertical bumps running up the trunk.

Leaves alternate, small and broad with a prominent tip. Dark glossy green above, paler and hairy below. Three veined with an easily seen mid vein, which is depressed on the upper side and raised on the lower side of the leaf. Net veins easily seen on the underside.

Pale green fragrant flowers form on short stemmed panicles from September to December. Fruit ripens from February to May. The fruit is somewhat longitudinally ribbed. Like most Australian Cryptocarya fruit, removal of the aril is advised to assist seed germination. Around 80% of the seeds will germinate, taking between three and six months. Plants generally take around 5 years to fruit in Brisbane Qld .

Taxonomy
The species was formally described in 1810 by botanist Robert Brown. Three subspecies are currently recognised:
 C. triplinervis var. pubens B.Hyland
 C. triplinervis var. riparia B.Hyland
 C. triplinervis R.Br. var. triplinervis

Gallery

References

External links
 
 
 

Trees of Australia
Flora of New South Wales
Flora of Queensland
Flora of Lord Howe Island
Laurales of Australia
triplinervis
Taxa named by Robert Brown (botanist, born 1773)